The axillary wrasse (Symphodus mediterraneus) is a species of wrasse native to the eastern Atlantic Ocean from the Azores and Madeira to the coasts of Portugal to Morocco and then along the coastal waters of the Mediterranean Sea. It can reach  in standard length, though most do not exceed . This species is important to local peoples as a food fish and is also sought as a game fish. It can also be found in the aquarium trade.

Adults are found mainly in eel-grass beds. Often in pairs. Males nest-makers. Feed mainly on mollusks, gastropods, bivalves, tubicolous worms, chitons, sea urchins and bryozoans. Oviparous, distinct pairing during breeding

References

External links
 
 

axillary wrasse
Fauna of the Azores
Fauna of Madeira
Fauna of Portugal
axillary wrasse
Taxa named by Carl Linnaeus